Grønning is a small village in the municipality of Hadsel in Nordland county, Norway.

Grønning may also refer to:

 Grønning Church, in the village of Grønning
 Jeppe Grønning (born 1991), Danish professional footballer
 Pia Grønning (born 1949), Danish film actor who has also performed in Hollywood movies
 Sebastian Grønning (born 1997), Danish footballer

See also
 Grønn, a surname
 

Surnames of Danish origin